Charles Miller (1918 – 1986) was an American author of popular history books on East Africa such as The Lunatic Express, An Entertainment in Imperialism (1971) and Battle for the Bundu, The First World War in East Africa (1974).

Miller lived in New York City and also wrote feature articles and book reviews for The Saturday Evening Post, Reader's Digest, The New Republic, and Saturday Review.

Books
Miller, Charles (1971), The Lunatic Express, An Entertainment in Imperialism
Miller, Charles (1974), Battle for the Bundu, The First World War in East Africa
Miller, Charles (1977), Khyber: British India's North West Frontier, Macmillan

References

1986 deaths
1918 births
Writers from New York City
20th-century American male writers